The Kedah State Executive Council is the executive branch of the State Government of Kedah, Malaysia. The Council is composed of the Menteri Besar, the Leader of the council, appointed by the Sultan on the basis that he/she commands the majority support in the Kedah State Legislative Assembly, (half of the number of the members of the assembly). The State Government of Kedah is also assisted by the State Secretary, the State Legal Adviser and the State Financial Officer.

This Council is similar in structure and role to the Cabinet of Malaysia, while being smaller in size. As federal and state responsibilities differ, there are a number of portfolios that differ between the federal and state governments.

Members of the Council are selected and nominated by the Menteri Besar, but appointed by the Sultan. The Council a number of committees; each committees will be chaired by the respective members, will take care of certain state affairs, activities and departments. Members of the Council are always the chair of a committee.

Members

Full members 

As of 10 November 2022, Members of the Council have been:

Ex officio members

See also 
 Sultan of Kedah
 List of Menteris Besar of Kedah
 Kedah State Legislative Assembly

References

External links 
 Kedah State Government

Politics of Kedah
Kedah